100 is the fourth studio album by Andy Stochansky.  It was produced by Goo Goo Dolls front-man Johnny Rzeznik.

Track listing
 "All The Things You Are" – 3:34
 "Shine" – 3:32
 "Best Years" – 3:20
 "That Summer" – 3:43
 "One Man Symphony" – 3:19
 "House of Gold" – 3:13
 "Loud" – 2:56
 "Beautiful Thing" – 3:34
 "America" – 2:58
 "Rockstar" – 3:37
 "Butterfly Song" – 2:30
 "Wish" – 3:44

Andy Stochansky albums
2005 albums
Albums produced by Johnny Rzeznik